Kate Lackey is a diplomat from New Zealand who was their high Commissioner to Australia (2002-2005) and in 1997, was appointed their first female Deputy Secretary of Foreign Affairs and Trade.

Lackey was also High Commissioner to Canada and Barbados from 2006 until 2010.

References

High Commissioners of New Zealand to Australia
High Commissioners of New Zealand to Barbados
High Commissioners of New Zealand to Canada
New Zealand women ambassadors
Year of birth missing (living people)
Living people
21st-century New Zealand women politicians